The 2009 FIVB Women's World Grand Champions Cup was held in Tokyo and Fukuoka, Japan from November 10 to November 15, 2009. Italy won the tournament with perfect record and Simona Gioli was selected Most Valuable Player.

Teams

Squads

Competition formula
The competition formula of the 2009 Women's World Grand Champions Cup was the single Round-Robin system. Each team plays once against each of the 5 remaining teams. Points are accumulated during the whole tournament, and the final standing is determined by the total points gained.

Venues
Tokyo Metropolitan Gymnasium (Tokyo)
Marine Messe Fukuoka (Fukuoka)

Results

|}

Tokyo round

|}

Fukuoka round

|}

Final standing

Team Roster
Cristina Barcellini, Immacolata Sirressi, Giulia Rondon, Jenny Barazza, Paola Cardullo, Serena Ortolani, Francesca Piccinini, Valentina Arrighetti, Eleonora Lo Bianco, Antonella Del Core, Lucia Bosetti, Simona Gioli
Head Coach: Massimo Barbolini

Awards
MVP:  Simona Gioli
Best Scorer:  Kim Yeon-Koung
Best Spiker:  Simona Gioli
Best Blocker:  Yang Hyo-Jin
Best Server:  Malika Kanthong
Best Setter:  Yoshie Takeshita
Best Libero:  Fabiana de Oliveira

References

External links
Official Website of the 2009 World Grand Champions Cup 
Official FIVB Results

FIVB Volleyball Women's World Grand Champions Cup
World Grand Champions Cup
FIVB Women's World Grand Champions cup
V